Markiyeh Rural District is a rural district (dehestan) in Mirza Kuchek Janghli District, Sowme'eh Sara County, Gilan Province, Iran. At the 2006 census, its population was 5,007, in 1,363 families. The rural district has 8 villages.

References 

Rural Districts of Gilan Province
Sowme'eh Sara County